The Culion tree squirrel (Sundasciurus moellendorffi) is a species of rodent in the family Sciuridae. It is endemic to the Philippines. Its natural habitat is subtropical or tropical dry forests.

References

Thorington, R. W. Jr. and R. S. Hoffman. 2005. Family Sciuridae. pp. 754–818 in Mammal Species of the World a Taxonomic and Geographic Reference. D. E. Wilson and D. M. Reeder eds. Johns Hopkins University Press, Baltimore.

Sundasciurus
Rodents of the Philippines
Mammals described in 1898
Endemic fauna of the Philippines
Fauna of the Calamian Islands
Taxonomy articles created by Polbot